is a visually impaired Japanese long distance and marathon runner. She silver medalled at the 2016 Summer Paralympics in Rio de Janeiro, and won the gold medal at 2020 Summer Paralympics in Tokyo.

References

External links
 

1977 births
Living people
Japanese female long-distance runners
Paralympic athletes of Japan
Paralympic medalists in athletics (track and field)
Paralympic silver medalists for Japan
Athletes (track and field) at the 2016 Summer Paralympics
Medalists at the 2016 Summer Paralympics
People from Dazaifu, Fukuoka
Athletes (track and field) at the 2020 Summer Paralympics